Calf Creek Falls refers to a pair of perennial waterfalls on the Calf Creek in the Grand Staircase–Escalante National Monument in central Garfield County, Utah, United States, that total .

Description
While both tiers are accessible by trail (with both trailheads just off Utah State Route 12), there is no direct access between the tiers.

Lower tier
Lower Calf Creek Falls is a  cascade and is very popular, because it can be reached by an easy hike on a  roundtrip trail.

Upper tier
Upper Calf Creek Falls is an  plunge and is much less known, as it requires a  roundtrip scramble from the western ridgeline. Just above the upper falls is another smaller, but deep plunge pool (at the base a much smaller cascade) that has a somewhat easier access and is often used for swimming and diving.

Gallery

See also

 List of waterfalls in Utah

References

External links

 Lower Calf Creek Falls at worldofwaterfalls.com
 Upper Calf Creek Falls at worldofwaterfalls.com
 Hiking-Calf Creek Falls Lower at utah.com

Waterfalls of Utah
Landforms of Garfield County, Utah
Grand Staircase–Escalante National Monument
Tourist attractions in Garfield County, Utah
Tiered waterfalls